The Battle of Vértes (Hungarian: vértesi csata), was a conflict that broke out in 1051, when the Emperor Henry III tried to invade Hungary and was defeated by King Andrew I of Hungary and Duke Béla of Hungary.

Background 
After the death of King Saint Stephen I of Hungary in 1038, a series of succession conflicts arose in the kingdom, until King Andrew I secured power in 1046. After the death of the Emperor Saint Henry II, his successor, Emperor Conrad II, a member of another dynasty, tried to take Hungary as a vassal kingdom. His son, Emperor Henry III, also continued this same policy, and thus attacked the Kingdom of Hungary in 1051.

Andrew I was prepared that in time Henry III would want revenge for his previously lost estate. Andrew persuaded his brother, Béla, to return from Poland to Hungary in 1048, and made Prince Béla the commander-in-chief of the Hungarian armies, who had extensive political and military experience. He also granted his brother one third of the kingdom with the title of duke, also meant a high degree of independence for Béla. 

Skirmishes on the frontier between Hungary and the Holy Roman Empire first occurred in 1050. Emperor Henry III invaded Hungary in August 1051.

Battle 
The German army approached the Hungarians from two directions. One of the teams crossed the Vág River and penetrated until the Nitra River. Bypassing the western border gate (Bufferzone (Hungarian: gyepű) of Moson-Sopron), Henry III broke into Transdanubia from Styria. The other army was led by Bishop Gebhard of Regensburg, this corps secured the Danube River and on which the supply was transported to the army.

The German troops sought the battle, but the Hungarians used the scorched earth tactics against the imperial troops, just as Stephen did in 1030 against Conrad II. The population was evacuated from the German army, food was taken away or destroyed. Despite this, the Germans reached Vértes Hills and, according to some sources Székesfehérvár. However, Duke Béla directed his armies into the backs of the Germans to strengthen the part between Zala River and Rába River, as well as the bufferzones of Moson. The Germans were starving because they found no food and their supply was hampered. The German army were constantly accompanied by the Hungarians and minor clashes were almost in every day. The Hungarian horse archers struck the guards at night, wandered between the marching troops and disappeared after firing an arrow or two. It was then that the German decided, leaving the Vértes Hills, to turn north to the ships carrying the supplies. But the ships were no longer there, because Duke Béla captured one of their couriers and sent a letter to the bishop on behalf of the Germans stating that the campaign was over and return to Regensburg.

According to a legend documented in medieval Hungarian chronicles, the Vértes mountains were named after this incident: during the unsuccessful campaign of 1051–1052, the withdrawing German troops of Henry III, emperor of the Holy Roman Empire, scattered their armours to ease their escape through the mountains, hence the name Vértes (vért: Hungarian word for armor).

Aftermath 
After this defeat, the German armies were repelled by Andrew I of Hungary in the Battle of Pozsony in 1052, definitively ending Henry III's claims on Hungary.

References

Bibliography

Vértes
Vértes
Vértes
Vértes
Vértes
11th-century conflicts
1050s conflicts
1051